Orophia ammopleura is a species of moth in the family Depressariidae. It was described by Edward Meyrick in 1920, and is known from South Africa.

References

Endemic moths of South Africa
Moths described in 1920
Orophia
Moths of Africa